Lenborough is a hamlet in the parish of Buckingham next to Gawcott, in Buckinghamshire, England. It is in the civil parish of Gawcott with Lenborough.

Description
Lenborough consists mainly of barn conversions and farm houses and connects by footpath to the Buckingham Industrial Estate.

Anglo Saxon coins

On 21 December 2014, metal detectorist Paul Coleman discovered a hoard of 5,251½ Anglo-Saxon coins in near mint condition. The hoard was discovered during the Weekend Wanderers Detecting Club's end-of-year rally, and includes coins from the reigns of Æthelred the Unready (c.968-1016) and Cnut the Great, (c.985-1035).

References

External links
 The Weekend Wanderers Detecting Club's Xmas Special Dig Report (with many photographs)
 Video of the excavation of the hoard

Hamlets in Buckinghamshire